The Grolier Club is a private club and society of bibliophiles in New York City.  Founded in January 1884, it is the oldest existing bibliophilic club in North America.  The club is named after Jean Grolier de Servières, Viscount d'Aguisy, Treasurer General of France, whose library was famous; his motto, "Io. Grolierii et amicorum" [of or belonging to Jean Grolier and his friends], suggested his generosity in sharing books.  The Club's stated objective is "the literary study of the arts pertaining to the production of books, including the occasional publication of books designed to illustrate, promote and encourage these arts; and the acquisition, furnishing and maintenance of a suitable club building for the safekeeping of its property, wherein meetings, lectures and exhibitions shall take place from time to time ..."

Collections and programs
The Grolier Club maintains a research library specializing in books, bibliography and bibliophily, printing (especially the history of printing and examples of fine printing), binding, illustration and bookselling.  The Grolier Club has one of the more extensive collections of book auction and bookseller catalogs in North America.  The Library has the archives of a number of prominent bibliophiles such as Sir Thomas Phillipps, and of bibliophile and print collecting groups, such as the Hroswitha Club of women book collectors (1944–c. 1999) and the Society of Iconophiles.

The Grolier Club also has a program of public exhibitions which "treat books and prints as objects worthy of display, on a par with painting and sculpture."  The exhibitions draw on various sources including holdings of the Club, its members, and of institutional libraries. In 2013, it hosted an exhibition on women in science.

The Grolier Club is a member of the Fellowship of American Bibliophilic Societies.

History
The founders of the club were William Loring Andrews, Theodore L. DeVinne, A. W. Drake, Albert Gallup, Robert Hoe III, Brayton Ives, Samuel W. Martin, E. S. Mead, and Arthur B. Turnure. Perfection in the art of bookmaking is encouraged. E. D. French engraved the club's own bookplate as well as bookplates for many of its members.

Honorary members have included I.N. Phelps Stokes (elected 1927), Bruce Rogers (1928), Henry Watson Kent (1930), Franklin D. Roosevelt (1934), Rudolph Ruzicka (1946), Lawrence C. Wroth (1950), Carl Purington Rollins (1951), Elmer Adler (1952), Joseph Blumenthal (1967), and Mary C. Hyde Eccles (1989); while Honorary Foreign Corresponding members have included Emery Walker (elected 1920), Alfred W. Pollard (1921), Sir Geoffrey Keynes (1922), Michael Sadleir (1925), Stanley Morison (1951), Giovanni Mardersteig (1964), Howard M. Nixon (1971), Nicolas Barker (1972), John Carter (1973), and Hermann Zapf (2003).

Harry Elkins Widener, the wealthy young bibliophile whose early death in the sinking of the RMS Titanic inspired his mother to construct Harvard's Harry Elkins Widener Memorial Library, had been a member.

From April 20 to June 5, 1971, a newly-discovered pre-Columbian Maya codex was displayed in the club, giving the codex the name the Grolier Codex. In 1973 the club published a facsimile of the codex in a book by Michael D. Coe.

The Grolier Club has had three locations since its founding in 1884. Its first home was rented. It moved in 1890 to a Romanesque Revival building at 29 East 32nd Street (now a designated landmark), and in 1917 to its current home (designed by Bertram Grosvenor Goodhue) at 47 East 60th Street in New York's Silk Stocking District.

In 2013, plans were announced for a 51-story apartment tower to be built beside the Grolier Club, using air rights purchased from the club and from the adjoining Christ Church.

List of presidents
The following people have served as presidents of the club:

 Robert Hoe III (1884–1888)
 William Loring Andrews (1888–1892)
 Beverly Chew (1892–1896)
 Samuel Putnam Avery (1896–1900) Porträt: Medaille 1897 by Anton Scharff (1845–1903)
 Howard Mansfield (1900–1904)
 Theodore Low De Vinne (1904–1906)
 Edwin B. Holden (1906)
 Richard Hoe Lawrence (1906–1908)
 William F. Havemeyer (1908–1912)
 Edward G. Kennedy (1912–1916)
 Arthur H. Scribner (1916–1920)
 Henry Watson Kent (1920–1924)
 William B. Osgood Field (1924–1928)
 Lucius Wilmerding (1928–1932)
 William B. Ivins Jr. (1932–1935)
 Frederick Coykendall (1935–1939)
 Harry T. Peters (1939–1943)
 Edwin De T. Bechtel (1943–1947)
 Frederick B. Adams Jr. (1947–1951)
 Irving S. Olds (1951–1955)
 Arthur A. Houghton (1955–1957)
 C. Waller Barrett (1957–1961)
 Donald F. Hyde (1961–1965)
 Gordon N. Ray (1965–1969)
 Alfred H. Howell (1969–1973)
 Robert H. Taylor (1973–1975)
 Herman W. Liebert (1975–1978)
 Robert D. Graff (1978–1982)
 Frank S. Streeter (1982–1986)
 G. Thomas Tanselle (1986–1990)
 Kenneth A. Lohf (1990–1994)
 William Bradford Warren (1994–1998)
 William T. Buice III (1998–2002)
 Carolyn L. Smith (2002–2006)
 William H. Helfand (2006–2010)
 Eugene S. Flamm (2010–2014)
 G. Scott Clemons (2014–2018)
 Bruce J. Crawford (2018-2022)
 Nancy K. Boehm (2022 -   )

Publications
The Club has issued editions of the following works:
 Richard de Bury, Philobiblon
 George William Curtis, Washington Irving
 Robert Hoe, Catalogues of Early and Original Editions from Langland to Wither; Bookbinding as a Fine Art
 Geoffrey Keynes, A Bibliography of William Blake (1921)
 Theodore Low De Vinne, Historic Printing Types
 William Matthews, Modern Book Binding

See also
 List of American gentlemen's clubs
 Books in the United States

Notes

References

External links

 
 Journal of Library History, vol. 20 #2, Spring 1985, pp. 196–9, by Robert Nikirk [On the Grolier Club's bookplates]
 Fellowship of American Bibliophilic Societies
 
 
 Works issued by the Grolier Club at Hathi Trust

Bertram Goodhue buildings
Bibliophiles
Bookbinding
Clubs and societies in New York City
Libraries in Manhattan
Museums in Manhattan
Cultural history of New York City
Organizations established in 1884
Gentlemen's clubs in the United States
Upper East Side
1884 establishments in New York (state)